Qikiqtaarjuk may refer to:

Qikiqtaarjuk, an island in the Canadian Arctic Archipelago
Qikiqtaarjuk, a peninsula on the north side of Igloolik Island
Qikiqtaarjuk, one of the two areas in the Arvia'juaq and Qikiqtaarjuk National Historic Site